The Fall of Jerusalem (German:Jeremias) is a 1922 German silent historical film directed by Eugen Illés and starring Carl de V. Hundt, Theodor Becker and Jaro Fürth.

The film's art direction was by Siegfried Wroblewsky.

Cast
 Carl de V. Hundt as Jeremiah
 Theodor Becker as Nebukadnezar, Babylonian King
 Jaro Fürth as Bachur, der falsche Prophet  
 Werner Hollmann as King Zedekiah of Judea
 Georg John as Egyptian Emissary  
 Mara Markhoff as Rahel, Jeremiah's daughter  
 Cordy Millowitsch as Esther, Queen of Judea  
 Walter Rilla as Amosa, Captain of the Guard  
 Sacy von Blondel as Mirjam, Jeremiah's daughter  
 Wilhelm von Haxthausen as Maskir, Schatzmeister des Königs

References

Bibliography
 Hans-Michael Bock and Tim Bergfelder. The Concise Cinegraph: An Encyclopedia of German Cinema. Berghahn Books.

External links

1922 films
1920s historical films
German historical films
Films of the Weimar Republic
Films directed by Eugen Illés
German silent feature films
Films set in the 6th century BC
Films based on the Hebrew Bible
German black-and-white films
Films shot in Berlin
1920s German films